UFC 130: Rampage vs. Hamill was a mixed martial arts event held by the Ultimate Fighting Championship on May 28, 2011 at the MGM Grand Garden Arena in Las Vegas, Nevada.

Background
This event was to be the third meeting between Frankie Edgar and Gray Maynard and their second meeting for the UFC Lightweight Championship. The two met earlier in the year at UFC 125: Resolution with the fight ending in a split draw, and Edgar retaining his title. Their first encounter at UFC Fight Night: Florian vs. Lauzon saw Maynard win via unanimous decision.

It was later announced on May 9 that injuries to both forced the fight to be removed from the card. Edgar suffered broken ribs, while Maynard suffered a knee injury.

On February 9, it was rumored that Thiago Silva had been forced from his bout with Quinton "Rampage" Jackson and could be replaced by Rashad Evans.  Silva stated that he was not injured and was looking forward to his bout with Jackson.  Instead, information surfaced that Silva may have failed a pre-fight drug screening at UFC 125, which could have resulted in his suspension. It was then announced that the proposed Rashad Evans bout was never close to being signed, and that Rampage would face Matt Hamill.

Former Sengoku Middleweight Champion Jorge Santiago confirmed he has signed a contract with the UFC and returned to face Brian Stann at this event.

On April 20, Brad Pickett was forced to withdraw from his bout with Miguel Torres. Demetrious Johnson, who was set to fight Renan Barão on the undercard, stepped in as Pickett's replacement while Barão faced Cole Escovedo.

On April 27, Norifumi Yamamoto was forced out of his bout with Chris Cariaso due to injury. Michael McDonald, who was scheduled to take on Nick Pace at UFC 133, stepped in as Yamamoto's replacement.

Cody McKenzie was set to fight Bart Palaszewski in this event, but an injury forced him out of the card. UFC president Dana White later announced that Gleison Tibau would step up to replace McKenzie.  Palaszewski was also injured and replaced by returning UFC veteran Rafaello Oliveira.

UFC 130 featured two preliminary fights live on Spike TV, and the remainder of the preliminary bouts streamed on Facebook.

Results

Bonus awards
Fighters were awarded $70,000 bonuses.

Fight of the Night: Brian Stann vs. Jorge Santiago
Knockout of the Night: Travis Browne
Submission of the Night: Gleison Tibau

Reported Payout
The following is the reported payout to the fighters as reported to the Nevada State Athletic Commission. It does not include sponsor money or "locker room" bonuses often given by the UFC and also do not include the UFC's traditional "fight night" bonuses.

Quinton Jackson: $250,000 (no win bonus) def. Matt Hamill: $32,000
Frank Mir: $250,000 ($125,000 win bonus) def. Roy Nelson: $15,000
Travis Browne: $16,000 ($8,000 win bonus) def. Stefan Struve: $21,000
Rick Story: $34,000 ($17,000 win bonus) def. Thiago Alves: $33,000
Brian Stann: $46,000 ($23,000 win bonus) def. Jorge Santiago: $36,000
Demetrious Johnson: $12,000 ($6,000 win bonus) def. Miguel Torres: $30,000
Tim Boetsch: $36,000 ($18,000 win bonus) def. Kendall Grove: $26,000
Gleison Tibau: $50,000 ($25,000 win bonus) def. Rafaello Oliveira: $10,000
Michael McDonald: $12,000 ($6,000 win bonus) def. Chris Cariaso: $4,000
Renan Barão: $10,000 ($5,000 win bonus) def. Cole Escovedo: $6,000

References

Ultimate Fighting Championship events
2011 in mixed martial arts
Mixed martial arts in Las Vegas
2011 in sports in Nevada
MGM Grand Garden Arena